Moira Brown (born 20 November 1952) is a British former swimmer. She competed in the women's 200 metre butterfly at the 1972 Summer Olympics.

References

External links
 

1952 births
Living people
British female swimmers
Olympic swimmers of Great Britain
Swimmers at the 1972 Summer Olympics
Place of birth missing (living people)
Female butterfly swimmers
20th-century British women